Monroe County Airport  is a county-owned, public-use airport in Monroe County, Ohio, United States. located one nautical mile (2 km) north of the central business district of Woodsfield, Ohio. This airport is included in the National Plan of Integrated Airport Systems for 2011–2015, which categorized it as a general aviation facility.

Facilities and aircraft 
Monroe County Airport covers an area of 105 acres (42 ha) at an elevation of 1,197 feet (365 m) above mean sea level. It has one runway designated 7/25 with an asphalt surface measuring 3,805 by 75 feet (1,160 x 23 m).

For the 12-month period ending June 3, 2011, the airport had 3,324 aircraft operations, an average of 277 per month: 63% general aviation, 19% military, and 18% air taxi. At that time there were 10 aircraft based at this airport: 90% single-engine and 10% ultralight.

References

External links 
 Aerial image as of April 1994 from USGS The National Map
 

Airports in Ohio
Transportation in Monroe County, Ohio